In potential theory, a discipline within applied mathematics, the Furstenberg boundary is a notion of boundary associated with a group.  It is named for Harry Furstenberg, who introduced it in a series of papers beginning in 1963 (in the case of semisimple Lie groups).  The Furstenberg boundary, roughly speaking, is a universal moduli space for the Poisson integral, expressing a harmonic function on a group in terms of its boundary values.

Motivation
A model for the Furstenberg boundary is the hyperbolic disc .  The classical Poisson formula for a bounded harmonic function on the disc has the form

where P is the Poisson kernel.  Any function f on the disc determines a function on the group of Möbius transformations of the disc by setting .  Then the Poisson formula has the form

 

where m is the Haar measure on the boundary.  This function is then harmonic in the sense that it satisfies the mean-value property with respect to a measure on the Möbius group induced from the usual Lebesgue measure of the disc, suitably normalized.  The association of a bounded harmonic function to an (essentially) bounded function on the boundary is one-to-one.

Construction for semi-simple groups
In general, let G be a semi-simple Lie group and μ a probability measure on G that is absolutely continuous.  A function f on G is μ-harmonic if it satisfies the mean value property with respect to the measure μ:

There is then a compact space Π, with a G action and measure ν, such that any bounded harmonic function on G is given by

for some bounded function  on Π.  

The space Π and measure ν depend on the measure μ (and so, what precisely constitutes a harmonic function).  However, it turns out that although there are many possibilities for the measure ν (which always depends genuinely on μ), there are only a finite number of spaces Π (up to isomorphism): these are homogeneous spaces of G that are quotients of G by some parabolic subgroup, which can be described completely in terms of root data and a given Iwasawa decomposition.  Moreover, there is a maximal such space, with quotient maps going down to all of the other spaces, that is called the Furstenberg boundary.

References
 
 
 

Potential theory